Garcibuey is a village and municipality in the province of Salamanca,  western Spain, part of the autonomous community of Castile-Leon.

Geography
The village has a small reservoir built in 1940.

References

Municipalities in the Province of Salamanca